Pseudaneitea multistriata is a species of air-breathing land slug, a terrestrial gastropod mollusc in the family Athoracophoridae, the leaf-veined slugs.

References

Athoracophoridae
Gastropods of New Zealand
Gastropods described in 1963